The Bannen Way is an American crime drama web series starring Mark Gantt as Neal Bannen, a third generation criminal who wants to get out of the con man lifestyle he's been living.  The show officially premiered on Crackle on January 6, 2010, but the first three episodes began streaming on December 23, 2009 to qualify for the Streamy Awards. The fact that this series, along with several others, were regionally geoblocked led to a controversy over eligibility for the Streamys because it was not made fully available on the World Wide Web.  The controversy led to a ruling by the Streamys that geoblocked web series are eligible.  The Bannen Way is a production of Sony Pictures Television.  The executive producers are Mark Gantt and Jesse Warren.  Gantt's co-stars are Vanessa Marcil, Gabriel Tigerman, Michael Ironside, and Robert Forster. Episodes were streamed weekdays through January 22, 2010. It was not renewed for a second season. The entire series was released onto DVD as a movie on July 20, 2010.

Plot
Neal Bannen is a charming con-man with a police chief for a father (Michael Ironside), a mob boss for an uncle (Robert Forster), and a weakness for fine women. He wants to turn his life around and leave the criminal lifestyle for the straight and narrow, but after gambling away the funds he had earmarked to pay off his final debts, Bannen must accept one more job working for his uncle, Mr. B, to retrieve a mysterious box. To complete the job, Bannen solicits the help of his college-aged, techy sidekick Zeke (Gabriel Tigerman), and Madison (Vanessa Marcil), a beautiful and street savvy thief.

Cast
Mark Gantt as Neal Bannen
Vanessa Marcil as Madison
Gabriel Tigerman as Zeke
Robert Forster as Mr. B
Michael Ironside as Chief Bannen
Michael Lerner as The Mensch
Ski Carr as Sonny Carr

Episodes

References

External links
 
 

2009 web series debuts
2010 web series endings
Crime web series
Crackle (streaming service) original programming
Streamy Award-winning channels, series or shows